Nanpantan is a suburb in the unparished area of Loughborough, in the Charnwood borough of Leicestershire, England.  It is located in the south-west of the town of Loughborough, but the village is slightly separated from the main built-up area of Loughborough. It is also the site of the Nanpantan Reservoir.

The first edge rails used in a wagonway were on the Charnwood Forest Canal, in the section between Nanpantan and Loughborough.

Inside Nanpantan is a gastropub called The Priory. There is a small church here: Saint Mary in Charnwood, which was originally built as a mission room by the owner of Nanpantan Hall in 1888. After some years as a chapel of ease to the ecclesiastical parish of Emmanuel, Loughborough, Saint Mary in Charnwood became a parish in its own right, on 1 January 2015.

Nanpanton became a civil parish in 1894, being formed from the rural part of Loughborough, on 1 April 1936 it was abolished and merged with Loughborough. In 1931 the parish had a population of 680.

References

External links 

Villages in Leicestershire
Borough of Charnwood